Manalur is a panchayat village in the Papanasam taluk of Thanjavur district, Tamil Nadu, India.

Demographics 
Manalur had not been demarcated as of the 2001 census.

References 

Villages in Thanjavur district